Sun Yijing (born 20 November 1992 in Shanghai) is a Chinese competitor in synchronized swimming.

She won a silver medal at the 2015 World Aquatics Championships, and 2 gold medals at the 2014 Asian Games.

References
Asian Games Profile

Living people
Chinese synchronized swimmers
1992 births
World Aquatics Championships medalists in synchronised swimming
Synchronized swimmers from Shanghai
Artistic swimmers at the 2014 Asian Games
Asian Games medalists in artistic swimming
Synchronized swimmers at the 2015 World Aquatics Championships

Asian Games gold medalists for China
Medalists at the 2014 Asian Games